Slavko Kacunko, b. 1964 in Osijek (Croatia) was Professor  for Art History and Visual Culture at the University of Copenhagen (Aug. 2011-Dec. 2019). His academic field is art- and culture history and media theory.

He studied philosophy, art history and pedagogy at the University of Zagreb and Osijek, Promotion in Düsseldorf (1999), Habilitation in Osnabruck (2006). 2003 – 2009 Junior Professor for Art History of the Modern Period at the University of Osnabruck (Germany). 2010 - 2011 Representation Professorship for Visual Studies and Media Theory at the University of Düsseldorf. From 2011 to 2019 Full Professor  for Art History and Visual Culture at the University of Copenhagen, Denmark.

Books (in German) 

Marcel Odenbach. Performance, Video, Installation 1975 – 1998, (1999)
Dieter Kiessling. Closed-Circuit Video 1982 – 2000 (2001)
Las Meninas transmedial. Painting. Catoptrics. Videofeedback“ (2001)
Closed Circuit Video Installations. A Contribution to the History and Theory of Media Art (2004); Review in Sehepunkte (2006) 
Mirror. Medium. Art. On the History of Mirror in the Age of Image (2010). 
Review in Süddeutsche Zeitung, 28.04.2011
 Marcel Odenbach. Performance, Video, Installation 1975 – 1998. München/Mainz 1999, .
Spiegel. Medium. Kunst. Zur Geschichte des Spiegels im Zeitalter des Bildes (2010), 
Differenz, Wiederholung und Infinitesimale Ästhetik. Matthias Neuenhofer. eva - edition video art #1.  (2012), 
with Dawn Leach (eds): Image-Problem? Medienkunst und Performance im Kontext der Bilddiskussion (2007), .
(ed): Theorien der Videokunst. Theoretikerinnen 1988–2003. eva - edition video art #3 (2018), .
(ed): Theorien der Videokunst. Theoretikerinnen 2004–2018. eva - edition video art #4 (2018), .

Books (in English) 

with Yvonne Spielmann (eds): Take it or leave it. Marcel Odenbach. An Anthology of Texts and Video Documents. eva - edition video art #2. Berlin 2013, 
Culture as Capital (2015), .
with Hans Körner und Ellen Harlizius-Klück (eds): Framings. Berlin 2015, .
Sabine Kacunko. Bacteria, Art and other Bagatelles. Vienna 2016, .
 After Taste. Critique of Insufficient Reason. Berlin 2021, .

Published articles include: M.A.D. Media Art Database(s)and the Challenges of Taste, Evaluation, and Appraisal; in: Leonardo Journal'', Issue 42:3, June 2009.

References

External links 
http://www.slavkokacunko.com

1964 births
Living people
People from Osijek
Academic staff of the University of Copenhagen
Heinrich Heine University Düsseldorf alumni
University of Zagreb alumni
Academic staff of Osnabrück University
Academic staff of Heinrich Heine University Düsseldorf
Osnabrück University alumni